The Aske Baronetcy, of Aughton in the East Riding of the County of York, is a title in the Baronetage of the United Kingdom. It was created on 21 January 1922 for the barrister and liberal politician Sir Robert Aske.

Aske baronets, of Aughton (1922)
Sir Robert William Aske, 1st Baronet (1872–1954)
Sir Conan Aske, 2nd Baronet (1912–2001)
Sir Robert John Bingham Aske, 3rd Baronet (born 1941)

References

Kidd, Charles, Williamson, David (editors). Debrett's Peerage and Baronetage (1990 edition). New York: St Martin's Press, 1990.

Baronetcies in the Baronetage of the United Kingdom